Rev. Edward Henry Bradby (1827–1893) was a classicist.

Academic timeline
Educated at Rugby School and Balliol College, Oxford (1845)
Canon of St. Albans
Principal at Hatfield College, Durham University (1852)
House Master at Harrow (1853–1868)
Headmaster of Haileybury College (1868–1883)

Bradby retired somewhat early from Haileybury to do mission work in the east end of London, where he remained until his death.

Children
Lucy Barbara Hammond (née Bradby), Historian
Henry Christopher Bradby, Cricketer, Poet, Teacher, father of poet Anne Ridler
Godfrey Fox Bradby, Author, Teacher
Edward Bradby, Cricketer, Solicitor
Mabel Agatha Bradby (1865–1944), mother of Letitia Chitty,structural analytical engineer, first female fellow of the Royal Aeronautical Society
Dorothy Bradbury

References

Academics of Durham University
1827 births
1893 deaths
British classical scholars
Alumni of Balliol College, Oxford
People educated at Rugby School
Masters of Hatfield College, Durham